Simon Ives (sometimes spelled Yves or Ive or Ivy) (1600 - 1662) was an English composer and organist who was active in the court of Charles I of England. He composed many pastoral dialogues, partsongs, glees, and works for organ. He also composed music for the theatre, and a considerable amount of music for solo lyra viol or that was transcribed for lyra viol.

References

External links

1600 births
1662 deaths
English Baroque composers
English classical composers
English male classical composers
17th-century classical composers
17th-century English composers
17th-century male musicians